also known as  is a spin-off of the Japanese manga series Sorcerer Hunters. Satoru Akahori and Miku Yuki published the original story in MediaWorks' Monthly Dengeki Comic Gao!

Synopsis
In a world of magic and mystery, a group of noble warriors known as the Sorcerer Hunters dedicated their lives to upholding justice and ridding the kingdom of tyrannical sorcerers and demonic creatures. However, this tale does not follow their heroic exploits.

Instead, this is the story of a cold-hearted sorcerer named Shibas Scotch, also known as Chivas, who worked as a bounty hunter to eliminate powerful sorcerers and malevolent monsters for a fee.

One day, Shibas was hired by Count Cuttlefish to eliminate an evil monster that was terrorizing a nearby village. However, things took a turn for the worse when Shibas failed to defeat the creature and was forced to transfer his consciousness into the body of his servant, a beautiful young woman named Gin Fizz.

Episodes

1. My Master is a Real Wretch
2. Even the Pure Maiden is a Real Wretch

Characters 
As listed in the DVD:

Shibas (Chivas) Scotch

Gin Fizz

Shibas (Chivas) Fizz

Kiss the werewolf

Genmi

Million Dollar

Count Cuttlefish

Meru

Taru

Icarus

Opening and Ending

The Opening is a Narration.

The Ending is "My First WONDER SENSATION"
Lyrics by Miki Takino
Music by Nobuo Ito
Song by Anri Minowa

References

External links

1999 anime OVAs
ADV Films
Adventure anime and manga
Comedy anime and manga
Dengeki Bunko
Dengeki Comic Gao!
Fantasy anime and manga
Sorcerer Hunters